The Tocantins gubernatorial election was held on 5 October 2014 to elect the next governor of the state of Tocantins, Brazil.  If no candidate had received more than 50% of the vote, a second-round runoff election would have been held on 26 October.  Governor Sandoval Cardoso ran for his first full term after becoming governor in 2014, but lost to former Governor Marcelo Miranda in the first round.

Candidates

Coalitions

Opinion polling

Results

References

2014 Brazilian gubernatorial elections
Tocantins gubernatorial elections
October 2014 events in South America